The Strasskirchen Solar Park is a large photovoltaic power station in Bavaria, with an installed capacity of 54 MW. It was developed by a joint venture of MEMC and Q-Cells in 2009. At this time this Solar Park was the second largest PV Power Plant. Q-Cells also provided the solar modules for the facility which is located in Straßkirchen, Bavaria, Germany.

See also 

 List of photovoltaic power stations

References 

Photovoltaic power stations in Germany